RNAF may refer to:	

 Royal Netherlands Air Force (also RNLAF), the military aviation branch of the Netherlands Armed Forces
 Royal Norwegian Air Force (also RNoAF), the air force of Norway